Stick is a character appearing in American comic books published by Marvel Comics. He is a blind sensei and leader of the Chaste who trained Matt Murdock and Elektra Natchios.

Stick appeared in the 2005 film Elektra portrayed by Terence Stamp, and in the first two seasons of the streaming television series Daredevil and the miniseries The Defenders (2017), set in the Marvel Cinematic Universe (MCU), portrayed by Scott Glenn.

Publication history
Stick first appeared in Daredevil #176 and was created by Frank Miller.

Fictional character biography
The mysterious Stick is a blind sensei who trained Matt Murdock.

Stick has made it his mission to keep the Chaste pure and clean from any evil infection. He forbade another of his prominent students, Elektra Natchios, from remaining in their ranks because of her vengeful personality, in spite of her formidable progress.

Stick is quite punishing and arrogant with his charges. He encountered Wolverine in his feral state and brought him back to reasoning, in part because of continued battering from his bō staff and hard-nosed advising.

Eventually, the Hand sought to wipe out Stick and the good warriors of the Chaste altogether. Stick thwarted an assassination attempt by four Hand operatives; he then summoned the other members of his order to New York City. With the assistance of his clan, Stick defeated Kirigi, the Hand's most lethal ninja at the time. The Hand regrouped and attacked Stick and his band of warriors (Shaft, Stone, and Claw) that now included Daredevil and Daredevil's former lover, the Black Widow. The Hand had almost overpowered the small band of warriors, when Stick and Shaft resorted to an ancient technique that drained the life force from all ninja present. Unfortunately, the technique resulted in the explosion and deaths of Stick and his comrade as a result of the excess energy they had absorbed. Despite their losses and the escape of the superheroes, the Hand considered the destruction of their nemesis and leader of their enemy a victory and turned their attention to other schemes.

Years later, the Hand turned its attention to the leaderless Chaste, once again attempting to destroy them. This time they sought to prevent the Chaste's members from locating the newborn child that would bear Stick's reincarnated soul. The Hand severely harmed Stick's soldiers, reducing their number to a handful of warriors. The few Chaste remaining traveled to New York, seeking the assistance of Daredevil who reluctantly aided his former mentor's disciples. In Japan, the Hand attacked the Chaste and Daredevil relentlessly. Fighting alongside Daredevil, the Chaste barely managed to escape and safeguard their master's reincarnated spirit.

As part of All-New, All-Different Marvel, the Collector resurrects Stick to compete for him in the third iteration of the Contest of Champions. During the fourth on-panel battle, Stick secretly allies with the Sentry of Earth-1611, a reluctant member of the opposing team assembled by the Grandmaster. When their alliance is revealed, the two are vaporized by Punisher 2099's Molecular Disintegrator. While experimenting with the Iso-Sphere, the Maestro unintentionally brings Stick back in the form of an elderly Rick Jones. In the final battle, Stick sheds his disguise, distracts the Maestro by resurrecting the Sentry and instructs Outlaw on how to use the Iso-Sphere to end the Contest of Champions. Stick is afterwards shown back on Earth, where he forms a new superhero team with Outlaw, Ares, Guillotine, and White Fox.

Other versions

Ultimate Marvel
The Ultimate Marvel version of Stick is introduced in the third volume of Mark Millar's Ultimate Avengers as someone who trained along with Matt Murdock, Blade, Shaft, and Stone by their mentor Anthony. Stick is later seen training a 13-year-old blind boy (Ray Connor) to be a new Daredevil after Murdock's death in the NY Ultimatum wave. Stick has been training Ray for weeks and is about to graduate, but is later bitten and turned into a vampire. He later appears to be in the possession of the vampire Nerd-Hulk (an intelligent clone of the Hulk) under orders of their leader Vampire X. After Anthony is killed by Nerd Hulk, Stick led Nerd Hulk's uprising at the Triskelion. He and most vampires are later killed in Iran after being teleported there by Captain America using Perun's hammer and then Blade impaling him in the chest with his sword.

Spider-Gwen
In Spider-Gwen, Stick is depicted a vigilante who saves a young Matt Murdock after his father is killed in front of him, recruiting him to his war on crime before he himself is killed in battle by ninja; Matt subsequently kills the ninja who killed Stick, before he is recruited to the Hand, ultimately setting on the path towards becoming the Kingpin.

In other media

Television

Live action
 Stick appears in television series set in the Marvel Cinematic Universe, portrayed by Scott Glenn.
 Stick first appears in his self-titled episode of season one of Daredevil. He approaches Matt Murdock shortly after his father is killed, leaving him orphaned at the age of ten, and begins to train him. Stick teaches Matt to master his abilities, but leaves him when Matt begins to see him as a father figure, because Stick considers it weakness. Many years later, Stick enlists Matt's help in destroying the Black Sky, a weapon that the Hand, led by Murakami's second-in-command Nobu, are bringing to New York City. Stick reluctantly agrees to refrain from killing, but breaks his promise when he kills the Black Sky, who is actually a young boy. After fighting in Matt's apartment, Matt defeats Stick, who is impressed and agrees to leave the city. Stick later converses with a heavily scarred man about Matt's role in events to come. 
Stick takes a more prominent role in season two, where he first appears rescuing Matt and a badly wounded Elektra from the Hand when they are attacked while investigating Midland Circle. During Elektra's recovery, he reveals more about the history of the Hand and how he raised and trained Elektra when she was a girl. Elektra sends him out of the apartment when Matt convinces her she does not need to follow him. Stick sends an assassin after her, but the man fails and she comes after him. Matt stops a fight between the two before they are ambushed by the Hand and he is kidnapped. It is revealed that Elektra is the Black Sky and Stick raised her to fight her destiny. When she became too dangerous around his colleagues, he sent her to live with a Greek ambassador. Stick is rescued by Matt and Elektra, who is convinced by Matt not to kill him. Matt ties him up at his apartment, but he escapes and decapitates Nobu after Matt defeats him to ensure that he does not come back.  Matt and Stick later part on good terms after visiting Elektra's grave. 
 Stick reappears as a main cast member in The Defenders. Stick is introduced being held captive by Elektra and Alexandra, who managed to capture him after killing all of his fellow associates within the Chaste. Stick manages to escape, cutting off his own right hand to free himself from his restraints. Through a tip from Colleen Wing, he tracks down Matt, Jessica Jones, Luke Cage, and Dany Rand to recruit their help. They manage to fight their way out when Alexandra, Madame Gao, Sowande, Murakami and Elektra attack them. They escape, in the process capturing Sowande. Stick later decapitates Sowande when he tries to kidnap Danny. Convinced that Danny needs to be killed to prevent the Hand from acquiring him, Stick has him tied to a chair and left under Luke's guard, then uses incense to drug Luke. This proves to be Stick's undoing, as Elektra tracks Danny down to the hideout and attacks Stick. After a short sword fight, Elektra disarms her former sensei, and just as Matt and Jessica arrive, she stabs him to death in spite of Matt's attempts to talk her down. She then knocks out Matt, Luke and Jessica in quick succession, and escapes with Danny by jumping out a window. Matt is devastated by Stick's death and in a perpetual state of shock when recounting the incident to Foggy later on. 
 Glenn revealed that Jeph Loeb had told him that Stick could still return in future Marvel projects despite the character's death; saying "I remember Jeph saying, 'We're in the Marvel Universe. If Elektra kills you, that doesn't necessarily mean you're dead.' And I said, 'Okay.' But for me, the show is over, unless I get a phone call, and then it will or won't [continue] depending on the deal and all of that stuff. It's hard to answer that question [would he be interested in reprising the role]. All of that stuff really lies with the script writer and with lines, and do I really want to go back and deal with those contact lenses again? I don't know. It's an impossible question to answer."

Animation
 Stick appears in the Spider-Man episode "Framed". He appears in a flashback as Matt Murdock recalls his education under Stick's tutelage.
Stick appears in the Hit-Monkey episode "Legend of the Drunken Monkey".

Film
 Stick appears in Elektra, portrayed by Terence Stamp.

Video games
 Stick appears in the Daredevil video game for the Game Boy Advance. In the beginning of the game, he informs Daredevil that the Kingpin has put a price on Daredevil's head. After Daredevil defeats Kirigi, he mentions that the Kingpin has a mysterious connection to the Sewer King. When Daredevil beats Echo, he warns Daredevil that Bullseye is waiting for him at a construction site.
 Stick is mentioned in Marvel: Ultimate Alliance, as Daredevil recounts his origin to the player character.
 Stick appears in the mobile game Marvel Avengers Academy. He is a mini-boss and later recruitable playable character in the Defenders event.

In popular culture
 The character Splinter from the media franchise Teenage Mutant Ninja Turtles was created as a parody of Stick.

See also
 Zatoichi

References

External links
Stick at Marvel.com

His profile at the Appendix to the Marvel Handbook

Characters created by Frank Miller (comics)
Comics characters introduced in 1981
Daredevil (Marvel Comics) characters
Fictional blind characters
Fictional bojutsuka
Fictional characters with superhuman senses
Fictional Native American people
Fictional martial arts trainers
Fictional ninja
Marvel Comics film characters
Marvel Comics male characters
Marvel Comics martial artists
Marvel Comics telepaths
Marvel Comics television characters